Euaresta regularis is a species of fruit fly in the genus Euaresta of the family Tephritidae.

Distribution
Brazil.

References

Tephritinae
Insects described in 1993
Diptera of South America